The 820th Radar Squadron is an inactive United States Air Force unit. It was last assigned to the Boston Air Defense Sector, stationed at the Fort Heath radar station, Massachusetts. It was inactivated on 1 December 1962.

The unit was a General Surveillance Radar Squadron providing for the air defense of the United States. It is unique in that it is the only unit originally activated as a Radar Squadron that was redesignated as an Aircraft Control & Warning Squadron   An earlier 820th Aircraft Control and Warning Squadron had been programmed for activation at Robins AFB, GA, but that action was cancelled.

Lineage
 Constituted as the 820th Radar Squadron (SAGE) on 28 August 1959
 Activated on 18 October 1959
 Redesignated 820th Aircraft Control and Warning Squadron on 1 December 1961
 Discontinued and inactivated on 1 December 1962

Assignments
  Boston Air Defense Sector, 18 October 1959 – 1 December 1962

Stations
  Fort Heath, Massachusetts, 18 October 1959 – 1 December 1962

See also
Fort Heath

References

 Cornett, Lloyd H. and Johnson, Mildred W., A Handbook of Aerospace Defense Organization  1946 - 1980,  Office of History, Aerospace Defense Center, Peterson AFB, CO (1980).
 Information for Fort Heath, Winthrop, MA

External links

Radar squadrons of the United States Air Force
Aerospace Defense Command units
Military units and formations in Massachusetts
Military units and formations established in 1959